is Nightmare's first live album. This was their first performance at Nippon Budokan on September 23, 2007.  It reached #11 in the Oricon charts.

Track listing

References

2008 live albums
Nightmare (Japanese band) albums
Live albums by Japanese artists
Albums recorded at the Nippon Budokan